Ender Memet (born 22 February 1967) is a Romanian wrestler. He competed at the 1992 Summer Olympics, the 1996 Summer Olympics and the 2000 Summer Olympics.

References

1967 births
Living people
Romanian male sport wrestlers
Olympic wrestlers of Romania
Wrestlers at the 1992 Summer Olympics
Wrestlers at the 1996 Summer Olympics
Wrestlers at the 2000 Summer Olympics
Sportspeople from Constanța
World Wrestling Championships medalists